Porto Leone may refer to:

 A former name of the port and town of Piraeus, Athens, Greece
 A former village on the island of Kalamos (island), Greece